1985–1990: The A List is a compilation album by Wire. It was released on 18 May 1993 by Mute Records. It comprises recordings by the band from 1985 to 1990 and is seen as the band's second "best of", complementing 1989's On Returning (1977–1979), the "best of" album for the first era of the band.

As the back cover states, the track listing was decided by asking various compilers to name their "Top 21" Wire tracks from the 1985–1990 era in order of preference, which were then arranged on a "football league" basis. The final chosen tracks and running order are based on this chart and the maximum running time of a compact disc, with no edits to songs.

Critical reception 
AllMusic's Steve Huey felt that the compilation could have been sequenced better since "the selections were simply arranged according to which ones received the largest number of votes, meaning that the compilation loses a little steam since many of the best songs appear toward the beginning." Huey called it "a handy overview of the band's uneven comeback albums" and "the best way to hear catchy slices of post-punk avant-pop like "Ahead," "Kidney Bingos," "Eardrum Buzz," and "In Vivo." He concluded that "for all but the most devoted, The A List is probably all that's necessary from this period."

Track listing

Personnel 
Credits adapted from the album's liner notes.

 Wire

Colin Newman 
Graham Lewis 
Bruce Gilbert
Robert Gotobed

 Production

 Gareth Jones – production, engineering, mixing [1–3, 5, 6, 8–12, 14–16] 
 Daniel Miller – production, mixing [3, 5, 14], remixing [7] 
 Rico Conning – production, engineering, mixing  [4, 7]
 David M. Allen – production, mixing [13]
 David Heilmann – engineering [2, 8, 11, 12]
 Roy Spong – engineering [13]
 André Giere – assistant engineering [1, 6, 9, 10, 15, 16]
 Giles Martin – remixing [7]
 Colin Newman – remixing [7], editing, compilation
 Paul Kendall – editing, compilation
 Roland Brown – editing, compilation
 Jon Wozencroft – design

References

External links 

 

1993 greatest hits albums
Wire (band) compilation albums
Mute Records compilation albums